Robida is a Slovenian and French surname Notable people with the surname include:
Adolf Robida (1885–1928), Slovenian playwright, journalist, and translator
Albert Robida (1848–1926), French illustrator, etcher, lithographer, caricaturist, and novelist
Camille Robida (1880–1938), French architect
Henri Robida (1902–1933), French aviator
Ivan Robida (1871–1941), Slovenian neurologist, psychiatrist, poet, writer and playwright
Jacob D. Robida (1987–2006), American murderer
Karel Robida (1804–1877), Slovenian physicist, monk and writer
Michel Robida (1909–1991), French journalist and writer

See also
 
Robidas

References

Slovene-language surnames
French-language surnames